Aung Kaung Mann (born on 18 February 1998) is a Burmese professional footballer who plays as a striker for Thai League 2 club Customs United.

Club

International

International goals

References

External links
 Aung Kaung Mann at EnglishUDFC.com

1998 births
Living people
Burmese footballers
Myanmar international footballers
Ayeyawady United F.C. players
Aung Kaung Mann
People from Magway Division
Association football forwards
Competitors at the 2017 Southeast Asian Games
Competitors at the 2019 Southeast Asian Games
Southeast Asian Games medalists in football
Southeast Asian Games bronze medalists for Myanmar
Competitors at the 2021 Southeast Asian Games